B24 or B-24 may refer to:
 Consolidated B-24 Liberator, an American World War II heavy bomber
 Autovia B-24, a highway in Catalonia, Spain connecting Barcelona to the towns of Penedès
 Blackburn B-24, a 1937 carrier-based aircraft

See also
A model of the Lancia Aurelia car